Emyvale, known before the Plantation of Ulster as Scarnageeragh, is a village and townland in the north of County Monaghan, Ireland. Its population is about 700.

History
In 1959, a Bronze Age tomb was discovered which proved that there was a settlement at the site of the village more than 3,000 years ago. Unfortunately for historians, the urn and other artifacts found were inadvertently destroyed during excavation of the tomb. 

The name Scairbh na gCaorach (the Irish language name for Emyvale) means 'shallow ford of the sheep', referring to a low (and easily traversable) point in the Mountain Water river on which Emyvale is situated.

The name is thought to have come from the Ui Meith tribe, the village's first inhabitants. Scairbh na gCaorach was abbreviated to "Scarna" in the early part of the 19th Century (indeed a local hostelry bears this name), although this fell out of common usage and village is now referred to by its English language name – Emyvale. In the 8th century, the McKenna Clan arrived and, by the 12th century, they had established an independent túath or kingdom in North Monaghan which would last for the next 450 years.

In more recent times, Emyvale was immortalised by the renowned 19th-century Irish writer William Carleton as part of his Traits and Stories of the Irish Peasantry series, which included The Fair of Emyvale (a short story based upon Carleton's experiences of the north Monaghan landscape where he was educated as a young man at a 'hedge school' situated beside St Mary's chapel, Glennan, near Glaslough).

Notable people 
 Tommy Bowe, Irish rugby player
 Thomas Taggart, American politician

References

See also
 List of towns and villages in Ireland.

Towns and villages in County Monaghan
Townlands of County Monaghan